is the second compilation album by Japanese idol duo Wink, released by Polystar on December 21, 1992. It covers the duo's singles from 1988 to 1992.

The album peaked at No. 18 on Oricon's albums chart and sold over 58,000 copies.

Track listing 
All lyrics are written by Neko Oikawa, except where indicated; all music is arranged by Satoshi Kadokura, except where indicated.

Charts

References

External links 
 

1992 compilation albums
Wink (duo) compilation albums
Japanese-language compilation albums